There are currently no common-carrier narrow-gauge railways in Turkey.

Historical
 The Palamutluk–Balya–Mancılık railway, a  gauge,  line serving coal and lead mines, operating as early as 1884 and closed by 1945.  
 The Ilıca–Palamutluk railway, a  gauge,  line operating from 1924 until 1950. It connected with the 600mm gauge Balya line and transported ore and coal to the coast for shipment.  
 Samsun–Çarşamba Railway Line,  gauge, 37 km of a planned 150 km line was actually built, from Samsun to Çarşamba and was closed in 1971. 
 Chemin de Fer Moudania Brousse (Mudanya Bursa Railway) in Bursa, 42 km  gauge, closed in 1948.
 A  gauge railway for the construction of the standard-gauge Baghdad Railway.

Park railway
 Eskişehir Sazova park railway,  gauge, a line of 1200m was built at the campus of Osman Gazi Universitesi (OGÜ) in Eskişehir, later transferred to Savova park, where a circuit line was built.(in service)(?)

Children's railways
Three  gauge children's railways were built in Turkey.
 Afyon children railway in Afyon(closed)
 Ankara Gençlik Park Railway, in Ankara(removed)
 Izmir International Fair Park Railway in Izmir(removed)

References